Sadie Calvano (born April 8, 1997) is an American actress, known for her role as Violet Plunkett on the CBS sitcom Mom. In 2016 she played the titular role in the television film The Perfect Daughter. She was a competitive gymnast before focusing on acting full-time after fourth grade.

Filmography

Awards and nominations

References

External links
 
 

1997 births
Actresses from Los Angeles
American television actresses
Living people
21st-century American actresses